Ozzie Newsome Jr. (born March 16, 1956) is an American professional football executive and former player who is the executive vice president of player personnel of the Baltimore Ravens of the National Football League (NFL). Newsome was a tight end for the Cleveland Browns of the National Football League (NFL). He was inducted into both the College Football Hall of Fame (1994) and the Pro Football Hall of Fame (1999). He is also the former general manager of the Baltimore Ravens (1996–2018) and now serves as a behind-the-scenes executive with the team. Newsome is widely regarded as one of the greatest tight ends of all time.

College career
Newsome played for  Alabama, where he started for all four years of his college career.  Nicknamed "The Wizard of Oz," Newsome made the College Football All-America Team in 1977 and assisted the Crimson Tide to a 42–6 overall record during his four seasons.  In total, Newsome amassed 102 receptions for 2,070 receiving yards and 16 touchdowns, while also returning 40 punts for 301 yards.  His 20.3 average yards per catch was a Southeastern Conference record for over 20 years.  Newsome was named the Alabama Player of the Decade for the 1970s. He was a two-time All-SEC player (in 1976 and 1977), and named SEC Lineman of the Year in 1977 by the Birmingham Quarterback Club and the Atlanta Touchdown Club. In 1994, Newsome was enshrined in the College Football Hall of Fame. Coach Paul "Bear" Bryant called him "the greatest end in Alabama history and that includes Don Hutson. A total team player, fine blocker, outstanding leader, great receiver with concentration, speed, hands."

Professional career
Newsome was drafted in the first round with the 23rd pick in the 1978 NFL Draft for the Cleveland Browns. He was named the Browns' Offensive Player of the Year his rookie year, the first time in 25 years that a rookie had received that honor. Newsome went to the Pro Bowl in 1981, 1984 and 1985.  In 1984, Newsome set a franchise record for receiving yards in a game (191) that stood for 29 years until it was broken in 2013 by Josh Gordon (who recorded 237 and 261 yards in back-to-back games). In 1986, Newsome won the Ed Block Courage Award for playing with injuries, and in 1990, he won the Byron "Whizzer" White NFL Man of the Year Award for his community service.  Though he was never able to play in a Super Bowl, Cleveland made the playoffs seven times during Newsome's career, and made three trips to the AFC championship game.

Newsome finished his career with 662 receptions and 7,980 yards, both Cleveland franchise records, and 47 touchdowns, fifth all-time.  In 1999, Newsome was inducted into the Pro Football Hall of Fame.

Football executive
Newsome was a front office executive with the Cleveland Browns from 1991 until their relocation to Baltimore in 1996; he has remained an executive with the Baltimore Ravens since their inaugural season. On November 22, 2002, Newsome was named the first general manager of the Ravens, making him the first African-American to occupy that position in the NFL.

Newsome earned his first Super Bowl ring when the Ravens defeated the New York Giants 34–7 in Super Bowl XXXV in 2001, and earned a second ring after the Ravens defeated the San Francisco 49ers in Super Bowl XLVII by a score of 34–31 in 2013.

Ravens owner Steve Bisciotti announced on February 2, 2018, that Newsome would step down following the 2018 season and assistant general manager Eric DeCosta would become the team's new GM. Although DeCosta is the team's general manager, Newsome is still employed by the Ravens in an active and significant role and he is listed as Executive Vice President on the Ravens Official Website.

Other awards 
In 2003, Newsome received the United States Sports Academy's highest honor, the Eagle Award, in recognition of his significant contributions to international sport.

Newsome is a member of the Cleveland Browns' "Ring of Honor", becoming a member of the first class inducted on September 19, 2010.

References

External links
 Baltimore Ravens bio
 
 
 

1956 births
Living people
American football tight ends
American sports executives and administrators
Alabama Crimson Tide football players
Baltimore Ravens executives
Cleveland Browns executives
Cleveland Browns players
National Football League general managers
All-American college football players
American Conference Pro Bowl players
College Football Hall of Fame inductees
Pro Football Hall of Fame inductees
People from Muscle Shoals, Alabama
Players of American football from Alabama
African-American players of American football
African-American sports executives and administrators
21st-century African-American people
20th-century African-American sportspeople
Ed Block Courage Award recipients